PNS Hameed is a very low frequency (VLF) radio transmitter facility of the Pakistan Navy, located near at the coastal areas of Karachi, Sindh, Pakistan. The primary mission of this naval base is to communicate orders with the submerged submarines in the Arabian sea at very low frequency. It is the first of its kind facility with very low frequency transmission capabilities, which will enable the Pakistan Navy to communicate with its submerged submarines.

The base was inaugurated by the Chairman Joint Chiefs of Staff General Rashad Mahmood and Chief of Naval Staff Admiral Muhammad Zakaullah in November 2016.

Resources

External links

Military radio systems
Hameed
Hameed
Military installations in Sindh
Pakistan Navy submarine bases
Military electronics